Saint-Ouen-sur-Seine (literally Saint-Ouen on Seine) is a commune in the northern suburbs of Paris, France, located  from the centre of Paris. It is part of the Seine-Saint-Denis department, in the Île-de-France region, and of the Métropole du Grand Paris. The commune was called Saint-Ouen until 2018, when it obtained a change of name by ministerial order.

The communes neighbouring Saint-Ouen-sur-Seine are Paris, to the south, Clichy, to the west, Villeneuve-la-Garenne, Gennevilliers and L'Île-Saint-Denis, to the north, and Saint-Denis to the east. The commune of Saint-Ouen-sur-Seine is part of the canton of Saint-Ouen-sur-Seine, which also includes L'Île-Saint-Denis and part of Épinay-sur-Seine. Saint-Ouen also includes the Cimetière de Saint-Ouen.

History
On 1 January 1860, the city of Paris was enlarged by annexing neighbouring communes. On that occasion, a part of the commune of Saint-Ouen was annexed to the city of Paris. At the same time, the commune of La Chapelle-Saint-Denis was disbanded and divided between the city of Paris, Saint-Ouen, Saint-Denis, and Aubervilliers. Saint-Ouen received a small part of the territory of La Chapelle-Saint-Denis. The commune of Montmartre was also disbanded; the city of Paris annexed most of Montmartre, but Saint-Ouen did receive a small northern part of the territory of that commune.

Population

Flea market

Saint-Ouen-sur-Seine is home to Paris' flea market, the highest concentration of antique dealers and second-hand furniture dealers in the world. The flea market (marché aux puces) is held every Saturday, Sunday, and Monday; because of this high frequency, compared to other flea markets, it has tended to consist only of professionals who rent their spot for a minimum term of three years. In 2014 the flea market site was acquired by Jean-Cyrille Boutmy from Gerald Grosvenor, 6th Duke of Westminster.

Transport
Saint-Ouen-sur-Seine is served by three stations of the Paris Metro: Garibaldi (line 13), Saint-Ouen (line 14 and RER line C) and Mairie de Saint-Ouen (lines 13 and 14).

Education

Schools and High Schools
Saint-Ouen-sur-Seine has :
 3 school groups of preschools and primary schools
 9 pre-schools
 8 primary schools
 3 "collèges" (lower secondary schools)
 Collège Jean Jaurès
 Collège Joséphine Baker
 Collège Jules Michelet
 2 High Schools/Sixth-form colleges
 Lycée Marcel Cachin
 Lycée Auguste Blanqui

Further and higher education 
Supméca, an accredited mechanical engineering school is located in the Vieux Saint Ouen quarter. It was created in 1948, is member of the university of Paris-Seine and now part of the ISAE Group, which has a total of 6000 students.
One literary and humanities Classe préparatoire aux grandes écoles at Lycée Blanqui High School's premises.

Notable people
Jacques Gondouin (1737–1818), architect
Alphonse Halimi (1932–2006), boxer
Louis Stettner (1922–2016), American photographer of "everyday poetry"
Dany Bill (b. 1973), seven-times Muaythai World champion.
Benjamin Cuq (b. 1974), journalist-writer
Abdoulaye Soumare (b. 1980), footballer 
Djimi Traore (b. 1980), footballer
Richard Clayderman (b. 1953), pianist
Tchavolo Schmitt (b. 1954), manouche swing guitarist (Porte de Montreuil and Chope des Puces)

Sport 
The Stade de Paris (also called the Stade Bauer) is located in the town.

Twin towns – sister cities

Saint-Ouen is twinned with:
 Terni, Italy
 Salford, England, United Kingdom
 Ruse, Bulgaria
 Podolsk, Russia

See also

Church of Saint-Ouen-le-Vieux, Roman Catholic
 Cimetière de Saint-Ouen, Saint-Ouen cemetery
Communes of the Seine-Saint-Denis department

References

External links

 Website about Saint-Ouen's Marché aux Puces
 Website about Saint-Ouen's Interests

Communes of Seine-Saint-Denis